(means "big island") is an uninhabited island in the Sea of Japan,  to the west from Matsumae town and therefore the westernmost point of Hokkaido. It is part of the town of Matsumae in Oshima Subprefecture in Hokkaido, Japan.

At , Ōshima is the largest uninhabited island under Japanese sovereignty. The island is a double caldera with a scoria hill rising in the middle. It is the peak of two overlapping stratovolcanoes and their associated calderas, Mount Higashi and Mount Nishi. The island consists of mafic alkali and non-alkali volcanic rock, less than 18,000 years old.

Because of volcanic activity and nature conservation, landing on the island requires the approval of the Agency for Cultural Affairs.

History

Because of the island's isolation and volcanic activity there are almost no records of its past left behind.  had a major eruption on 27 August 1741, which created a large horseshoe-shaped caldera breached to the north and extending from the summit down to the sea floor at the base of the volcano. This event produced a mostly submarine debris avalanche that traveled 16 km distance, and triggered a large tsunami. The tsunami devastated the coasts of Hokkaido, western Honshu, and as far as Korea, causing nearly 1500 deaths. The 1741 eruption was the largest in historical time at Ōshima and it ended with the construction of a basaltic cinder cone at the head of the breached caldera. No eruptions have occurred since the last eruption in 1790, but seismic unrest under the volcano occurred in 1996.

Flora and fauna
Ōshima is the northern limit of the breeding grounds for the streaked shearwater and is part of the Matsumae-Yakoshi Prefectural Natural Park. Baird's beaked whales are targets of commercial whaling in the nearby waters.

See also

 Desert island
 List of islands
 List of volcanoes in Japan

References

Sources
 Based on the translation of :ja:渡島大島 on 12 December 2008

Islands of the Sea of Japan
Islands of Hokkaido
Uninhabited islands of Japan
Matsumae, Hokkaido
Stratovolcanoes of Japan
Calderas of Japan